Francis Acharya (born Jean Richard Mahieu; 15 April 1919 – 31 January 2002) was a Belgian Cistercian monk of Scourmont Abbey. In 1998, he founded the Syro-Malankara rite Kristiya Sanyasa Samaj, Kurisumala Ashram. He was later affiliated to the Trappist Order.

Early life 

Jean Richard Mahieu was born on 15 April 1919 in Ypres, Belgium. He is the fifth son of the seven children of René Mahieu and Anée Vandelanotte.

He had his early education and college studies in Brussels. At the age of twenty he went to England for higher studies. In 1931, when Gandhi came to participate in the second Round Table Conference as - some English politician said - 'a half naked fakir', Mahieu was sympathetic with Gandhi's nonviolent fight for India's independence. As his own spiritual development unfolded, he saw in Gandhi a path toward a more spiritual and harmonious world civilization based on a balance between action and contemplation. In 1932, Mahieu had to complete his compulsory military service, in Belgium. During this time, he decided to become a monk, join the Cistercian (Trappist) Order, and go to India to lead a contemplative life in an ashram. He asked his father's permission and was denied due to his father's strong opposition to such a vocation. Nonetheless, in 1935, the young man joined a group of pilgrims going to Rome.

Monastic life 

In an audience with Pope Pius XI, he expressed his desires and asked prayers for his future vocation. In September 1935, at the age of 23, Mahieu joined the Cistercian Abbey of Our Lady of Scourmont, near Chimay, Belgium. He received a new name, Francis, with Francis of Assisi as his chosen patron upon beginning his religious vocation. After his novitiate formation, Francis made his first vows and was sent to the Gregorian University in Rome to obtain a degree of Bachelor of Divinity. He then did further theological studies at the University of Louvain in Belgium. He made solemn vows in 1940 and was ordained to the priesthood in 1941. Soon thereafter, he was appointed novice master at Scourmont. At this time, the abbot of Scourmont was planning to start a Cistercian monastery in India, which corresponded well with the wishes of Francis. Somewhat later, the abbot's interests began to turn toward Africa. Nonetheless, Francis was given permission to undertake a foundation by himself in India.

To India 
At that time, it was very difficult to get a visa for India from Belgium. However, Scourmont had a daughter house in Wales and Francis was given the opportunity to go to this monastery on Caldey Island as its novice master. After three unsuccessful applications for a visa for India he was eventually granted one through the recommendation of Vijayalaksmi Pandit, who was High Commissioner in England. Impressed by Francis's wish to work for the encounter between Christianity and Hinduism and by his determination to start a Christian monastic foundation rooted in the ashram tradition of India, Pandit Nehru, who was then the prime minister of India, approved the application on the condition that he would not try to convert anyone to Christianity. 

Francis set sail for India and arrived in Bombay on 12 July 1955. Swami Abhishiktananda welcomed him. In Bombay Francis's initiation to India was begun with visits to various ancient sites: Buddhist caves at Kanheri, the island of Elephanta, and Ajanta. At Elephanta, Francis and Abhishiktananda were profoundly impressed by the central cave, a magnificent temple with immense bas-reliefs (7th century) carved in the solid rock, dedicated to Shiva Maheshwara in his different manifestations. They passed the night in the cave, where the sight of Maheshwara Sadashiva (a huge carving of Shiva with three faces) had moved Swami Abhshiktananda to ecstasy. However, the meeting of the two monks, so long anticipated, was not entirely happy, probably on account of the inner turmoil that was tormenting Swami Abhishiktananda at that time. In any case, after visiting Ajanta, Abhishiktananda went on alone to explore north India, while his companion returned to Bombay.

Francis spent about one year in the ashram at Shantivanam with Jules Monchanin and Swami Abhshiktananda; he considered this year to be a period of novitiate for him in India with the two earlier pioneers on the same path. Afterwards, in November 1956, Francis left Shantivanam for Kerala.

Foundation of Kurisumala Ashram 

At the invitation of Zacharias Mar Athanasios, the Bishop of Tiruvalla, Francis went to Kerala to start the ashram. In the course of time, Bede Griffiths joined him there. On 1 December 1956, the two of them started the new foundation Kristiya Sanyasa Samaj,Kurisumala Ashram at Tiruvalla in the Syro-Malankara Catholic Church. Eventually they were successful in obtaining  of land, and on 20 March 1958, the eve of Saint Benedict's day, Francis, Griffiths, and two seminarians travelled sixty miles to the site, high up on the holy mountain of Kurisumala. Well contented with their hilltop, they spent the next few months in a hut made of bamboo and plaited palm leaves, with no facilities, no furniture, and a floor covered simply with cow dung. To support themselves they started a dairy farm with cattle imported from Jersey.

On 6 August 1968, Francis took Indian citizenship. Later the same month Griffiths, after ten years in Kristiya Sanyasa Samaj,Kurisumala Ashram, left for Shantivanam with two brothers, Anugrah and Ajit, to take over that ashram from Swami Abhishiktananda. By 1974, Francis's health was declining. For several months he underwent Ayurvedic treatment, staying in a Hindu doctor's house at Geethabhavan, Kottayam. In 1979, he returned to Belgium, back to the monastery of his youth, Scourmont Abbey, and in a hospital near the abbey he had a hip operation, which was not very successful. He returned to Kurisumala. Soon the other hip was also affected. Already at an advanced age, he started and completed his masterpiece, the Prayer with the Harp of Spirit, four volumes translated from the ancient Syrian book Panqitho, with certain adaptations to Indian culture.

Kurisumala Ashram, a Cistercian abbey 

In 1996, Francis went to Rome, together with Geevarghese Timotheos, to ask the General Chapter of the Cistercians of the Strict Observance to affiliate Kurisumala as a monastery of their order. After the necessary procedures were carried out, Kurisamala Ashram became a Cistercian abbey on 9 July 1998, with Francis being installed as the first abbot.

Final days 

Acharya died at Tiruvalla on the morning of 31 January 2002, after receiving Holy Communion. His body was kept until 4 February at Pushpagiri Medical College, Thiruvalla. 

He is currently a candidate for beatification.

References

Bibliography 
 Marthe Mahieu-De Praetere: Francis Mahieu Acharya, un pionnier du monachisme chrétien en Inde, Abbaye de Scourmont (cahiers scourmontois N°3), 2001, 384pp.

External links 
 Syro-Malankara Catholic Church

1919 births
2002 deaths
Belgian Cistercians
Syro-Malankara Catholic Church
Belgian Roman Catholic clergy
People from Ypres
20th-century Christian monks
21st-century Christian monks
People from Thiruvalla
21st-century venerated Christians